This is a list of the mammal species recorded in Bouvet Island. There are 12 mammal species in and around Bouvet Island, of which none are believed to be threatened.

The following tags are used to highlight each species' conservation status as assessed by the International Union for Conservation of Nature:

Order: Cetacea (whales) 

The order Cetacea includes whales, dolphins and porpoises. They are the mammals most fully adapted to aquatic life with a spindle-shaped nearly hairless body, protected by a thick layer of blubber, and forelimbs and tail modified to provide propulsion underwater.

Suborder: Mysticeti
Family: Balaenidae
Genus: Eubalaena
 Southern right whale, Eubalaena australis 
Family: Balaenopteridae
Genus: Balaenoptera
Fin whale, B. physalus 
Genus: Megaptera
Humpback whale, M. novaeangliae 
Suborder: Odontoceti
Superfamily: Platanistoidea
Family: Delphinidae (marine dolphins)
Genus: Lissodelphis
 Southern right whale dolphin, Lissodelphis peronii 
Genus: Globicephala
Long-finned pilot whale, G. melas 
Genus: Lagenorhynchus
Hourglass dolphin, L. cruciger

Order: Carnivora (carnivorans) 

There are over 260 species of carnivorans, the majority of which feed primarily on meat. They have a characteristic skull shape and dentition. 
Suborder: Caniformia
Family: Otariidae (eared seals, sealions)
Genus: Arctocephalus
 Antarctic fur seal, Arctocephalus gazella 
Subantarctic fur seal, A. tropicalis 
Family: Phocidae (earless seals)
Genus: Hydrurga
 Leopard seal, Hydrurga leptonyx 
Genus: Leptonychotes
 Weddell seal, Leptonychotes weddellii 
Genus: Lobodon
 Crabeater seal, Lobodon carcinophagus 
Genus: Mirounga
 Southern elephant seal, Mirounga leonina

See also
List of chordate orders
Lists of mammals by region
List of prehistoric mammals
Mammal classification
List of mammals described in the 2000s

Notes

References
 
IUCN Red List. Retrieved 7 November 2021.

Bouvet Island